Kalateh-ye Allah Resan (also Romanized as Kalāteh-ye Allāh Resān; also known as Kalāteh-ye Sarfarāz Khān) is a village in Jamrud Rural District, in the Central District of Torbat-e Jam County, Razavi Khorasan Province, Iran. At the 2006 census, its population was 82, in 19 families.

References 

Populated places in Torbat-e Jam County